How Is Your Fish Today?, also known as Jin Tian De Yu Zen Me Yang?, is a 2007 Chinese film written by Xiaolu Guo and Hui Rao.  It was directed by Guo. The film is a drama set in modern China, focusing on the intertwined stories of two main characters; a frustrated writer (Hui Rao) and the subject of his latest work, Lin Hao (Zijiang Yang). How Is Your Fish Today won 4 international awards and was well received by critics, but was not commercially successful.

Cast
 Hui Rao as himself
 Zijiang Yang as Lin Hao
 Xiaolu Guo as Mimi
 Ning Hao as Hu Ning

Reception
How Is Your Fish Today? was consistently given good ratings by reviewers, but still remains fairly unpopular.

Critics
On its release, How Is Your Fish Today? was received well by critics, who applauded the film as an impressive debut from Guo.

Awards
 "Grand Prix" at the 2007 Créteil International Women's Film Festival
 Special Mention at the 2007 Fribourg International Film Festival
 Special Mention at the 2007 Pesaro International Film Festival of New Cinema
 NETPAC Special Mention at the 2007 Rotterdam International Film Festival

Nominations

 "Tiger Award" at the 2007 Rotterdam International Film Festival
 "Grand Jury Prize" in the World Cinema/Dramatic categories at the 2007 Sundance Film Festival

References

External links
HOW IS YOUR FISH TODAY? site for Independent Lens on PBS 
 
 
 

2007 films
Chinese drama films
2000s Mandarin-language films
Films directed by Xiaolu Guo